The Manicoré State Forest is a state forest in the state of Amazonas, Brazil.

Location

The Manicoré State Forest is in the Novo Aripuanã municipality of Amazonas.

The Roosevelt River, running north from the state of Mato Grosso, divides the forest into a western and eastern part.
To the north both parts of the forest adjoin the Campos Amazônicos National Park.
The western part is bounded by the border with the state of Mato Grosso to the south. 
It adjoins the Rio Roosevelt Ecological Station and the Tucumã State Park in Mato Grosso.
The Madeirinha River, a tributary of the Roosevelt River, flows from Mato Grosso in a northeast direction through the western part of the forest.
The Roosevelt River separates the western part of the forest from the Guariba State Park, which lies to the east of the river.
The eastern part of the forest lies to the north of the Guariba State Park and adjoins the Guariba Extractive Reserve to the east.

History

The Manicoré State Forest was created by state governor decree 24806 of 19 January 2005 with the objective of promoting multiple sustainable uses of the forest resources and scientific research with emphasis on methods of sustainable exploitation of native forests.

Conservation

The forest is an integral part of the Apuí Mosaic, which totals  in area and contains the Guariba and Sucunduri State Parks; Bararati and Aripuanã sustainable development reserves; Guariba Extractive Reserve; and Sucunduri, Aripuanã, Apuí and Manicoré state forests.

Notes

Sources

State forests of Brazil
Protected areas of Amazonas (Brazilian state)
Protected areas established in 2005
2005 establishments in Brazil